Donkey Town may refer to:

Donkey Town, an album by Cornbugs
Donkey Town, Surrey, a village in England
"Donkey Town", a song from the album All the Roadrunning by Mark Knopfler and Emmylou Harris